Hampton Cemetery is a cemetery on Hollybush Lane in Hampton in the London Borough of Richmond upon Thames. It was opened in 1879 and is now managed by Richmond upon Thames London Borough Council.
Fourteen Commonwealth servicemembers of World War I and seven of World War II  are buried in the cemetery.

Notable burials and memorials
 Sir Francis Mark Farmer (1866–1922) was a dental surgeon and lecturer on dental surgery and pathology at the London Hospital who made contributions on facial restoration.
 There is a memorial to William Hodson (1821–1858) who was a British leader of irregular light cavalry during the Indian Mutiny; he is buried in Lucknow. His widow, Susan Annette Hodson (died 4 November 1884), who had a grace-and-favour apartment at Hampton Court Palace, is buried here.
 Eli Lemon Sheldon (1848–1892), a banker and author, husband of May French Sheldon, who died at Canister House, Hampton.

References

External links
 Official website
 

1879 establishments in England
Cemeteries in the London Borough of Richmond upon Thames
Commonwealth War Graves Commission cemeteries in England
Hampton, London